Bárcabo (in Aragonese: Barcabo) is a municipality located in the province of Huesca, Aragon, Spain. According to the 2018 census (INE), the municipality has a population of 105 inhabitants.

References

Municipalities in the Province of Huesca